The 2013 Giro d'Italia was the 96th edition of the Giro d'Italia, one of cycling's Grand Tours. It started in Naples and finished in Brescia. Vincenzo Nibali of team Astana won the general classification.

Teams

As a UCI World Tour race, the Giro was obliged to invite all teams in the UCI's top division—the ProTour teams—and these teams were obliged to take part. At the beginning of the season, there were, as in recent years, 18 ProTour teams, and the race organisers issued four wildcard invitations to fill the usual quota of 22 teams for the event. However,  successfully appealed against its loss of ProTour status to the Court of Arbitration for Sport and the UCI decided against demoting any of the other teams; meaning that 23 teams took part in the Giro, as happened under a special dispensation in 2011. The participating teams were:

*: Pro Continental teams given wild card entry to this event.

Pre-race favourites
2012 Giro winner Ryder Hesjedal, Bradley Wiggins, winner of the 2012 Tour de France, and Vincenzo Nibali were among the favourites for overall victory. Other possible contenders included Michele Scarponi, Cadel Evans, Robert Gesink and Samuel Sánchez.

Route and stages

On 30 September 2012 the complete route was announced in Milan. For the first time since 2008, the first stages of the race (eight in total) took place in the south of Italy. The island of Ischia also hosted a stage for the first time in 54 years.

In 2013, the race paid tribute to the victims of the Vajont Dam disaster of 1963, but also to composer Giuseppe Verdi in stage 13 and to famous cyclist and triple Giro winner Gino Bartali in stage 9. There was speculation before the race that some sections of the route may also be relevant for contenders of the world championships in Florence.

In a revocation of a rule change in the 2012 race, all mass-start stages again awarded time bonuses to the first three riders, 20, 12, and 8 seconds respectively. In 2012, stages classified high-mountain did not award time bonuses. This Giro was also the first to feature two intermediate sprints per road stage, rather than only one. These sprints awarded points to the points classification and bonus seconds in the general classification.

Race overview

The 2013 Giro d'Italia featured cold and wet weather, leading Bicycling magazine to call it "one of the more grueling Grand Tours in recent memory."  During the first week of the race it looked like it may be a close contest that came down to the final stages.  On the eighth stage, a time trial, Vincenzo Nibali took over the pink jersey (given to the overall leader).  Early departures by contenders Ryder Hesjedal and Bradley Wiggins took much of the drama out of the race.  By the final stages, all Nibali had to do was remain upright to claim victory.  ESPN's Andrew Hood described his performance as "three nearly perfect weeks of racing."  "Nibali revealed he is a complete rider, handling the stresses and demands of racing both on and off the bike," wrote Hood.  Nibali called winning the Giro "a dream" and said it was unlikely he would compete in the Tour de France.  It was the first time an Italian won the race outright since 2010.

Others with strong performance in the Giro d'Italia included Carlos Betancur, Mark Cavendish, Cadel Evans, and Rigoberto Urán.  Riding in his first grand-tour event, 23-year-old Betancur finished fifth overall and won the best young rider's jersey.  He had two second places on stages during the race.  "I won my Giro", he said.  Cavendish won five stages – all bunch sprints – and the points jersey.  He became the fifth rider to win the points jersey at all three grand-tour races. Evans was written off by many commentators following a poor 2012 season, but bounced back with a third-place finish at the Giro.  In so doing, he became the oldest rider to reach the podium since 1928. "I wasn't even planning on racing this Giro until a few weeks before it started, so to be [third] isn't so bad," he said.  Urán won the tenth stage, and took second overall.  His second-place finish came despite his loss of 1:30 on stage seven when he waited for teammate Bradley Wiggins to catch up to him.  It was the best finish by Colombian rider since 1995.

Classification leadership
In the 2013 Giro d'Italia, four different jerseys were awarded. For the general classification, calculated by adding each cyclist's finishing times on each stage, and allowing time bonuses for the first three finishers on mass-start stages, the leader received a pink jersey. This classification is considered the most important of the Giro d'Italia, and the winner is considered the winner of the Giro.

Additionally, there was a points classification, awarding a red jersey. In the points classification, cyclists received points for finishing in the top 15 in a stage. Unlike in the better known points classification in the Tour de France, the type of stage has no effect on what points were on offer – each stage had the same points available on the same scale. The winner earned 25 points, second place earned 20 points, third 16, fourth 14, fifth 12, sixth 10, and one point fewer per place down to a single point for 15th. In addition, points could be won in intermediate sprints.

There was also a mountains classification, the leadership of which was marked by a blue jersey. In the mountains classifications, points were won by reaching the top of a climb before other cyclists. Each climb was categorized as either first, second, third, or fourth-category, with more points available for the higher-categorized climbs. The Cima Coppi, the race's highest point of elevation, was worth still more points than the other first-category climbs.

The fourth jersey represents the young rider classification, marked by a white jersey. This was decided the same way as the general classification, but only riders born after 1 January 1988 were eligible.

There were also two classifications for teams. In the Trofeo Fast Team classification, the times of the best three cyclists per team on each stage were added; the leading team was the team with the lowest total time; the Trofeo Super Team was a team points classification, with the top 20 placed riders on each stage earning points (20 for first place, 19 for second place and so on, down to a single point for 20th) for their team.

The rows in the following table correspond to the jerseys awarded after that stage was run. In a break with the practice of recent years, defending Giro champion Ryder Hesjedal wore the pink jersey during the first stage.

Notes
 In stage 2, Nacer Bouhanni, who was third in the points classification, wore the red jersey, because Mark Cavendish (in first place) wore the pink jersey as leader of the general classification and Elia Viviani, who was second wore the white jersey as leader of the young rider classification.
 In stage 3, Alex Dowsett, who was second in the young rider classification, wore the white jersey, because Salvatore Puccio (in first place) wore the pink jersey as leader of the general classification during that stage.
 In stage 4, Mark Cavendish, who was second in the points classification, wore the red jersey, because Luca Paolini (in first place) wore the pink jersey as leader of the general classification during that stage. Also, Cadel Evans and John Degenkolb wore the red jersey for the same reason in stages 5, and 6, respectively. Cavendish also wore the red jersey in stage 21, despite being in second place, because Vincenzo Nibali (in first place) wore the pink jersey.

Final standings

General classification

Points classification

Mountains classification

Young riders classification

Trofeo Fast Team classification

Trofeo Super Team classification

Minor classifications
Other less well-known classifications, whose leaders did not receive a special jersey, were awarded during the Giro. These awards were based on points earned throughout the three weeks of the tour. Each mass-start stage had two intermediate sprints, the Traguardi Volante, or T.V. The T.V. sprints gave bonus seconds towards the general classification, points towards the regular points classification, and also points towards the T.V. classification. This award was known by various names in previous years, and was previously time-based. It was won by Brazilian Rafael Andriato of the  team. Andriato also won the Premio della Fuga, which rewarded riders who took part in a breakaway at the head of the field. Each rider in an escape of ten or fewer riders received one point for each kilometre that the group stayed clear.

Other awards included the Combativity classification, which was a compilation of points gained for position on crossing intermediate sprints, mountain passes and stage finishes. Points classification winner Mark Cavendish won this award. The Azzurri d'Italia classification was based on finishing order, but points were awarded only to the top three finishers in each stage. It was likewise won, like the closely associated points classification, by Cavendish. Teams were given penalty points for minor technical infringements.  were the only team to avoid being penalised altogether over the course of the race, and so won the Fair Play classification.

References

Citations

External links

 
Giro d'Italia by year
2013 in Italian sport
Giro d'Italia
2013 in men's road cycling
May 2013 sports events in Italy